The men's singles was a tennis event held as part of the tennis at the 1920 Summer Olympics programme. It was the sixth appearance of the event. A total of 44 players from 15 nations entered in the event; 41 players from 14 nations competed. The event was held from 16 to 23 August 1920 at the Beerschot Tennis Club. Nations were limited to four players each. The event was won by Louis Raymond of South Africa, the nation's second consecutive in the event (second-most all-time behind Great Britain's three). South Africa had nearly had both finalists again, as it had in 1912, but defending champion Charles Winslow fell to Japan's Ichiya Kumagae in the semifinal; Winslow took bronze by walkover against Noel Turnbull of Great Britain. Kumagae's silver was Japan's first medal in the event.

Background

This was the sixth appearance of the men's singles tennis event. The event has been held at every Summer Olympics where tennis has been on the program: from 1896 to 1924 and then from 1988 to the current program. Demonstration events were held in 1968 and 1984.

As in previous Games, the field for this event was relatively weak and without top competitors. The Olympic tennis tournament was no longer scheduled adjacent to or concurrent with Wimbledon, as it had been in 1908 and 1912; however, it was at the same time as the U.S. Championship this year. Bill Tilden and Bill Johnston, and all the other American players, thus did not enter. Australia's Gerald Patterson did enter, but withdrew.

Belgium, Czechoslovakia, Italy, Japan, Spain, and Switzerland each made their debut in the event. France made its fifth appearance, most among all nations, having missed only the St. Louis 1904 event.

Competition format

The competition was a single-elimination tournament with a bronze-medal match. All matches were best-of-five sets.

Schedule

Draw

Finals

Top half

Section 1

Section 2

Bottom half

Section 3

Section 4

The match between Lowe and Zerlendis was played over two days, and lasted for nearly six hours. At one point the ballboys, bored by the long rallying, left the court and went to lunch, forcing the match to stop until they returned.

Results summary

References

Sources
 
 
  ITF, 2008 Olympic Tennis Event Media Guide

Men's singles
Men's events at the 1920 Summer Olympics